Wrocław Medical University (Polish: Uniwersytet Medyczny we Wrocławiu, Latin: Universitas Medicus Vratislaviensis) is an institution of higher medical education in Wrocław, Poland.

It consists of five faculties: Medicine, Dentistry, Pharmacy, Public Health and Postgraduate Education. The total number of chairs and clinics is 107. Altogether, 891 academic professors and teachers work at the Medical University and about 3,500 students study there.

Wrocław Medical University has 22 international agreements of cooperation signed with other universities abroad. There is a wide exchange of students and teaching staff within the framework of the Socrates and Erasmus programmes of the European Union, especially with France, Germany, Italy, Sweden, Spain, the Netherlands and England.

History
Wrocław is a city with a rich medical tradition. The first hospital was founded in the 13th century. Medicine was first taught in 1745 by the establishment of the Collegium Medico-Chirurgicum. It was the first medical school in the city. Many famous doctors lived and worked in Wrocław such as Alois Alzheimer - neurologist and psychiatrist, who presented his findings regarding degeneration of the brain cortex (Alzheimer's disease), Robert Koch - creator of modern bacteriology (Nobel Prize in 1905), Paul Ehrlich - pioneer of present chemotherapy (Nobel Prize in 1908).

At present Wrocław is an active centre of medical education. The process of teaching is realised by a team of highly qualified specialists. The Medical University also performs a wide range of scientific activities and provides the whole region of Lower Silesia with highly specialised medical care.

Historically, the city's strategic location between branches of the slow running Oder River, which forms many islands in the area, was utilised in the Middle Ages when Wrocław was turned into a fortress. In early modern times, the system of defence was expanded. It is seen now as fortifications, surrounding its historical centre of original architecture. At the end of the Second World War, 70% of the town was destroyed. A great effort was needed to restore and rebuild the university buildings.

The Faculty of Medicine is the oldest and largest faculty of Wrocław Medical University. It was established on November 14, 1945, as one of the six faculties of Wrocław's University and Technical University. The opening lecture was given by Ludwik Hirszfeld. The scientific staff consisted mainly of professors from the Jan Kazimierz University in Lvov. In 1950, the Wrocław Medical University was established, consisting of the Faculty of Medicine and the Faculty of Pharmacy. Since then, 16,068 medical doctors and 4,715 dentists have graduated. On February 12, 1958, Prof. Wiktor Bross was the first in Poland to perform open heart surgery, which he did at the Faculty of Medicine, and on March 31, 1966, he performed the first kidney transplant from a living donor together with Prof. Wladyslaw Wrezlewicz. These achievements were significant in European medicine. A great number of prominent scientists have conducted research at the Faculty of Medicine, including Professors Ludwik Hirszfeld, Zygmunt Albert, Edward Szczeklik, Witold Orłowski, Stefan Ślopek  and Hugon and Zofia Kowarzyk.

Two new faculties, the Faculty of Postgraduate Medical Training in 1992 and Faculty of Dentistry in 2000, were created based on the organisational structure and lecturing staff of the Faculty of Medicine. After these changes, the Faculty of Medicine assumed more of the educational duties of the University. In 2002 the faculty received the PE-EN ISO 9001 certificate for its educational and research programs in accordance with the standards defined by the Polish Centre for Testing and Certification.

Rectors

 Zygmunt Albert (1950–1954)
 Antoni Falkiewicz (1954–1957)
 Bogusław Bobrański (1957–1962)
 Aleksander Kleczeński (1962–1965)
 Tadeusz Baranowski (1965–1968)
 Leonard Kuczyński (1968–1972)
 Stanisław Iwankiewicz (1972–1978)
 Eugeniusz Rogalski (1978–1981)
 Marian Wilimowski (1981–1987)
 Bogdan Łazarkiewicz (1987–1990)
 Zbigniew Kapnik (1990–1993)
 Jerzy Czernik (1993–1999)
 Leszek Paradowski (1999–2005)
 Ryszard Andrzejak (2005-2011)
 Marek Ziętek (2011–present)

Faculties 
 Faculty of Medicine
 Faculty of Dentistry
 Faculty of Postgraduate Medical Training
 Faculty of Pharmacy
 Faculty of Health Science

External links 
 
 English Division of the university

Universities and colleges in Wrocław
Medical schools in Poland